Bob and Mike Bryan were the defending champions, but lost in the quarterfinals to Marcel Granollers and Marc López.

Julien Benneteau and Édouard Roger-Vasselin won the title and ended a thirty-year drought of victories by French players in Men's Doubles at the French Open. They won against Marcel Granollers and Marc López 6–3, 7–6(7–1) in the final.

Seeds

Main draw

Finals

Top half

Section 1

Section 2

Bottom half

Section 3

Section 4

References 
Main Draw
2014 French Open – Men's draws and results at the International Tennis Federation

Men's Doubles
French Open by year – Men's doubles